The 1982 Islington Council election took place on 6 May 1982 to elect members of Islington London Borough Council in London, England. The whole council was up for election and the Labour party regained overall control of the council from the Social Democratic Party.

Background

Election result

Ward results

References

1982
1982 London Borough council elections
May 1982 events in the United Kingdom